(published in English as Equator Cold and Cold Equator) is a science fiction graphic novel published in 1992, written and illustrated by Yugoslavian-French cartoonist and storyteller Enki Bilal. It is the third and final part of the Nikopol Trilogy, started by La Foire aux immortels (The Carnival of Immortals) from 1980 and continuing with La Femme piège (The Woman Trap) in 1986. The books were awarded with the Book of the Year Award by the magazine Lire. Froid Équateur had an initial print run of more than 150,000 copies.

Chess boxing
The book extensively features chess boxing, a hybrid sport mixing chess and boxing. In 2003, chess boxing became a real sport, directly inspired by how it appeared in Froid Équateur.

References

1992 graphic novels
1992 comics debuts
Comics by Enki Bilal
3
Science fiction comics
Comics set in the 2020s